Fujiwara Nobuzane (1176–1265) was one of the leading Japanese portrait artists of his day.

Nobuzane was born in Kyoto, and was the son of Fujiwara Takanobu. Takanobu specialized in nise-e (“likeness picture”) portraits. Of his works that have survived, the most notable is a set of the Thirty-Six Poetry Immortals. Nobuzane's son Tametsugu and grandson Tamenobu carried on the family tradition of painting.

See also
yamato-e
Kamakura period
Murasaki Shikibu Diary Emaki

External links
 Britannica article
 Portraits of Court Nobles, by Fujiwara Nobuzane, Kyoto National Museum

Japanese portrait painters
1176 births
1265 deaths
13th-century Japanese painters